Pudding Thieves is a 1967 Australian film. It was the first movie from the "Carlton school".

Plot
Bill and George work as photographers, with a sideline in pornography. Bill's girlfriend discovers this and leaves him in disgust. Bill betrays George to the police.

Cast
Bernice Murphy as Pete
Bill Morgan as Bill
George Tibbits as George
Tina Date as George's girl
Burt Cooper as Pimp
Dorothy Bradley as religious woman
George Dixon as Bill's friend
David Kendall as rival pornographer
Julien Pringle as photographer
Bert Deling as pimp
Mandy Boyd as advertising girl
Nick Yardley
Chris Maudson
Peter Nicholls as the buyer
Sue Ingleton as model
Pat Black as model
Penny Brown as model

Production
The film was shot from 1963 to 1967 on borrowed 16 mm film equipment. It was largely funded by director Brian Davies who was a director at La Mama Theatre. The script evolved during production and three separate endings were shot.

Reception
The film was not widely seen but was influential as many people associated with La Mama became key players in the Australian film revival of the 1970s.

References

External links

The Pudding Thieves at Oz Movies
The Pudding Thieves at BFI Film Forever

1967 films
Australian drama films
1960s English-language films